Gustaf Johansson (10 January 1844 – 24 July 1930) was the Archbishop of Turku, and the spiritual head of the Evangelical Lutheran Church of Finland between 1899 and 1930.

Biography
Johansson was born in Ylivieska. He was ordained a priest in 1871 and graduated with a Bachelor of Theology in 1874 . He served as a Professor of Dogmatics and Ethics at the University of Helsinki between 1877 and 1885. As a professor, Johansson developed terminology in his field by creating Finnish-language responses to many theological words. He served as Bishop of Kuopio between 1885 and 1897 and later became Bishop of Savonlinna where he remained till 1899. In 1899 he was appointed Archbishop of Turku. As a bishop, he led Bible Translation Committee between 1886 and 1912 and participated in the Finnish and Swedish-language hymnal reform. He died in Turku, aged 86.

External links
Archbishops of Turku: Gustaf Johansson 

1844 births
1930 deaths
People from Ylivieska
People from Oulu Province (Grand Duchy of Finland)
Lutheran archbishops and bishops of Turku
Members of the Diet of Finland
19th-century Lutheran archbishops
20th-century Lutheran archbishops